Horezu is a town located in Vâlcea County, Oltenia, Romania, about 43 km from Râmnicu Vâlcea. The town administers six villages: Ifrimești, Râmești, Romanii de Jos, Romanii de Sus, Tănăsești and Urșani.

The town is well known for its people who make pottery and present it at an annual fair (see Horezu ceramics). There are special traditions which have been well preserved. The town has slightly over 6,000 inhabitants, most of them working in agriculture and services.

Horezu is the site of Horezu Monastery, a World Heritage Site.

Notable people
Ana Cartianu (1908–2001), academic, essayist, and translator
Lazăr Comănescu (b. 1949), diplomat, Minister of Foreign Affairs
Andrei Popescu (b. 1985), footballer

Twin towns - sister cities
Horezu is twinned with:
 Clervaux, Luxembourg

References

External links

 Awarded "EDEN - European Destinations of Excellence" non traditional tourist destination 2008

 
Towns in Romania
Populated places in Vâlcea County
Localities in Oltenia